The Killiney and Ballybrack Championships  was a late Victorian period tennis tournament first established in 1886 at Ballybrack, Killiney and Ballybrack, County Dublin,  Ireland and played on outdoor grass courts at the Killiney and Ballybrack Lawn Tennis Club,   Killiney and Ballybrack, County Dublin,  Ireland/ The tournament was staged until 1892 before it was discontinued.

History
The Killiney and Ballybrack Championships was a late Victorian era combined men's and women's tennis tournament established in 1886 at Ballybrack, Killiney and Ballybrack, County Dublin,  Ireland that was staged until 1892.

Finals

Men's Singles
(Incomplete roll)
 1886— Willoughby Hamilton  def.  Grainger Chaytor, 12–10, 0–6, 6–3, 5–7, 14–12.

Women's Singles
(Incomplete roll)
 1886— May Langrishe def.  Beatrice Langrishe, 6–4, 3–6, 6–1.

References

1886 establishments in Ireland
Defunct tennis tournaments in the United Kingdom
Republic of Ireland
Grass court tennis tournaments
Sport in County Dublin
Tennis tournaments in Ireland